Bibhutipur Assembly constituency is an assembly constituency in Samastipur district in the Indian state of Bihar.

Overview
As per Delimitation of Parliamentary and Assembly constituencies Order, 2008, No. 138 Bibhutipur Assembly constituency is composed of the following: Bibhutipur community development block; Bulakipur, Kamrawn, Malpur Purwaripatti, Rampur Jalalpur, Narhan estate, Bambaiya Harlal and Ajnaul gram panchayats of Dalsinghsarai CD Block.

Bibhutipur Assembly constituency is part of No. 22 Ujiarpur (Lok Sabha constituency). The assembly constituency consists 2.23 lakh voters and is dominated by the Kushwahas. It has been observed in the successive elections, by studying the voting pattern, that Kushwaha voters voting en masse decides the victory of a candidate.

Election results

1977-2010
In the 2010 state assembly elections, Ram Balak Singh of JD(U) won the Bibhutipur seat defeating his nearest rival Ramdeo Verma of CPI(M). Ramdeo Verma of CPI(M) defeated Ram Balak Singh of LJP in October 2005 and February 2005. Ramdeo Verma of CPI(M) defeated Chandrabali Thakur of Congress in 2000, 1995 and 1990. Chandrabali Thakur of Congress defeated Ramdeo Verma of CPI(M) in 1985. Ramdeo Verma of CPI(M) defeated Bandhu Mahato of Congress (I) in 1980. Bandhu Mahto of Congress defeated Suresh Prasad Mahato of Janata Party in 1977.

2015 Vidhan Sabha Election

2020 Vidhan Sabha Election

References

External links
 

Assembly constituencies of Bihar
Politics of Samastipur district
Samastipur